Montrigaud is a former commune in the Drôme department in southeastern France. On 1 January 2019, it was merged into the new commune Valherbasse.

Geography
The Galaure forms part of the commune's northern border.

Population

See also
Communes of the Drôme department

References

Former communes of Drôme